The 2019 IAAF World Cross Country Championships were hosted in the city of Aarhus in Denmark. It was the 43rd edition of the championships and was held on 30 March 2019.

A part of the course was run on the grounds and grass roof of the Moesgaard Museum. The race was held in challenging conditions, due to the very muddy course and steep hills. The senior men's race was won by Ugandan Joshua Cheptegei, while the senior women's race was won by Kenyan Hellen Obiri.

Schedule
In keeping with past events, all five races, including the mixed relay, were held in the middle of the day. The junior races preceded the senior races, and the senior men's event concluded the program.

Medalists

Medal table 

Note: Totals include both individual and team medals, with medals in the team competition counting as one medal.

Participation
520 athletes from 63 countries were scheduled to participate:

References

External links
Official website
IAAF competition website

 
2019
World Cross Country Championships
World Cross Country Championships
2019 in Danish sport
International athletics competitions hosted by Denmark
Cross country running in Denmark
IAAF World Cross Country
Sport in Aarhus